Hilary Laing (21 September 1927 – 16 November 2013) was a British alpine skier. She competed in three events at the 1952 Winter Olympics.

References

1927 births
2013 deaths
British female alpine skiers
Olympic alpine skiers of Great Britain
Alpine skiers at the 1952 Winter Olympics
Sportspeople from Guildford
People from Ellisfield